K-Electric Bin Qasim Power Station (BQPS) is a thermal power plant fueled by natural gas and fuel oil located near Port Bin Qasim, Karachi, Sindh.

It consists of BQPS-1 and BQPS-2.

References

Natural gas-fired power stations in Pakistan
Oil-fired power stations in Pakistan